Royal Air Force Greatham or more simply RAF Greatham is a former Royal Air Force station located in Greatham, County Durham, England.

It was also known as RAF West Hartlepool and was located at Hartlepool and was little more than a grass airstrip, a satellite station of RAF Thornaby.

History

It was home to four of 403 Squadron's Supermarine Spitfires from 19 June 1942 to 22 January 1943; operating forward from RAF Catterick.  

The airfield was once home to No. 645 Volunteer Gliding School, who operate Grob Vigilant Motor Gliders for the Air Training Corps. They are now located at RAF Topcliffe in Yorkshire.

The following units were also here at some point:
 'N' Flight of No. 1 Anti-Aircraft Co-operation Unit RAF
 No. 6 (Coastal) OTU RAF
 No. 26 Gliding School RAF
 No. 32 Elementary and Reserve Flying Training School RAF
 No. 243 Squadron RAF
 No. 1613 (Anti-Aircraft Co-operation) Flight RAF
 No. 2782 Squadron RAF Regiment
 No. 4054 Anti-Aircraft Flight RAF Regiment

Current use

Little now remains, as the site was developed after the war by British Steel Corporation.

See also
 List of former Royal Air Force stations

References

Organisations based in the Borough of Hartlepool
Buildings and structures in the Borough of Hartlepool
Royal Air Force stations in County Durham
History of the Borough of Hartlepool